Jhelum railway station (Urdu and ) is located in Jhelum city, Jhelum district of Punjab province, Pakistan.

See also
 List of railway stations in Pakistan
 Pakistan Railways

References

External links

Railway stations in Jhelum District
Railway stations on Karachi–Peshawar Line (ML 1)